Papal inauguration is a liturgical service of the Catholic Church within Mass celebrated in the Roman Rite but with elements of Byzantine Rite for the ecclesiastical investiture of a pope. Since the inauguration of Pope John Paul I, it has not included the 820-year-old (1143–1963) papal coronation ceremony.

It was in the 11th century that the inauguration took the form of a coronation. Along with other ceremonies used at papal inaugurations, a coronation became part of a pope's inauguration ritual from the time of Pope Nicholas II (1059–1061) until 1963. Pope Paul VI, the last pope to be crowned or to use a papal tiara, abandoned the use of his tiara in a ceremony at the end of the second period of the Second Vatican Council.

Over twenty tiaras are held in the Vatican. That of Paul VI is in the crypt of the Basilica of the National Shrine of the Immaculate Conception in Washington, D.C.

A small one is still used to symbolically crown a statue of Saint Peter on his saint's day every year. The first pope for over eight centuries to inaugurate his pontificate without a coronation was Pope John Paul I.

Abandonment of the coronation
Pope Paul VI, the last pope to be crowned or to use a papal tiara, abandoned the use of his tiara in a ceremony at the end of the second period of the Second Vatican Council, and announced that it would be sold and the money obtained would be given to charity; it was in fact bought by Catholics in the United States and is now kept in the Basilica of the National Shrine of the Immaculate Conception in Washington, D.C.

Though Paul VI decided not to wear a tiara, his 1975 apostolic constitution Romano Pontifici Eligendo continued to envisage a "coronation" ceremony for his successors. However, Pope John Paul I, elected in the August 1978 conclave, wanted a simpler ceremony, and commissioned Virgilio Noè, the Papal Master of Ceremonies, to design the inauguration ceremony that was used. Taking place in the context of a "Mass of Inauguration", the high point of the ceremony was the placing of the pallium on the new pope's shoulders, and the receiving of the obedience of the cardinals.

His successor, Pope John Paul II, followed suit, maintaining the changes made by his predecessor, though with additions. The Mass of inauguration was celebrated, not in the evening, as for John Paul I, but in the morning. Referring in his inauguration homily to coronation with the papal tiara, John Paul II said: "This is not the time to return to a ceremony and an object considered, wrongly, to be a symbol of the temporal power of the Popes."

In his 1996 apostolic constitution Universi Dominici Gregis, John Paul II laid down that a "solemn ceremony of the inauguration of a pontificate" should take place, but did not specify its form, which he left to each pope to decide.

Modern inauguration
Four modern popes have now used an inauguration ceremony without coronation: Pope John Paul I, Pope John Paul II, (both in 1978), Pope Benedict XVI (2005) and Pope Francis (2013).

The modern papal inauguration, developed from the form used for John Paul I, takes place during Mass (usually in Saint Peter's Square) and involves the formal bestowal of the pallium, the symbol of the pope's universal jurisdiction, on the newly elected pope by the senior Cardinal Deacon.

Pope Benedict XVI maintained those changes and also shortened, as explained below, the ceremony of homage previously paid at a papal inauguration by each cardinal individually, repeating the "act of homage and obedience" made in the conclave to the new pope before the announcement of his election to the people.

The ceremony does not include the alleged Papal Oath that some traditionalist Catholics claim, without evidence, to have been sworn by the popes before John Paul I. They criticise its absence, and some sedevacantist groups refuse to accept the legitimacy of the modern popes due to the absence of both the alleged oath and the symbolic tiara.

Inauguration of Benedict XVI

Pope Benedict XVI celebrated his inauguration on 24 April 2005 after being elected on 19 April 2005 having approved new procedures for the papal inauguration previously on 20 April 2005 the day after his election. The ceremony began with the pope and the cardinals kneeling at the Tomb of Saint Peter beneath the high altar of Saint Peter's Basilica—the popes are, according to Catholic dogma, the successors of Saint Peter, the first head of the Church in Rome—to give him homage, and ask his prayers. Pope Benedict said, "I leave from where the Apostle arrived." The pope and the cardinals then went in procession to Saint Peter's Square for the inauguration Mass, while the "Laudes Regiæ" was chanted, asking help for the new pope.

Receiving the pallium and the Ring of the Fisherman
The pope received the pallium and the Ring of the Fisherman. Cardinal Jorge Medina, the cardinal protodeacon, formally bestowed the pallium on the pope. The pallium used was different from that of previous popes: it was an earlier form practically identical to the ancient omophorion (still used to this day by Eastern bishops); wider than the standard archiepiscopal pallium, though not as wide as the modern omophorion; 2.4 metres (2.6 yards) long, made of wool with black silk tips. It had five embroidered red silk crosses instead of the six black ones of the normal archbishops' pallium. Pope Benedict later in his pontificate would use a pallium similar to that of his immediate predecessors, but with a longer, wider cut and six red crosses.

After the pallium was bestowed and before the Ring of the Fisherman was presented, Cardinal Stephen Kim Sou-hwan, as the senior cardinal-priest, pronounced the formal prayer for the new pope.

Cardinal Angelo Sodano, as the senior cardinal-bishop, formally presented the Ring of the Fisherman to the pope.

Act of homage
Instead of having each of the more than one hundred cardinals kneel before the pope individually to do him homage, twelve people, lay as well as clerical, did so: the senior Cardinal bishop Angelo Sodano, the Cardinal protopriest Stephen Kim Sou-hwan, the Cardinal protodeacon Jorge Medina, Bishop Andrea Erba the bishop of Benedict's former suburbicarian diocese of Velletri-Segni, Father Enrico Pomili the priest serving as pastor of Benedict's former titular church Santa Maria Consolatrice al Tiburtino when he was a Cardinal priest, a deacon, a religious brother, a Benedictine nun, a married couple from Korea, and a young woman from Sri Lanka and a young man from the Democratic Republic of the Congo, each of whom had been recently confirmed.

After the ceremony
After Mass, Pope Benedict greeted inside St. Peter's Basilica, before the main altar, various delegations present for his inauguration. In the days following, he visited the other major basilicas of Rome. On 25 April 2005, the day after his inauguration at St. Peter's, he paid homage to the other founder of the church of Rome by visiting St. Paul Outside the Walls. On 7 May, he took possession of the Archbasilica of St. John Lateran—his cathedral church. Later that evening he venerated the Salus Populi Romani icon of Mary in the Basilica of Saint Mary Major.

Inauguration of Francis 

Pope Francis celebrated his papal inauguration on 19 March 2013, the Solemnity of Saint Joseph, following his election on 13 March 2013. He used a mitre he has had since he first became a bishop. His chasuble matched the mitre. He used the same pastoral staff that Benedict XVI used. Pope Francis kept the chants and liturgical actions simple. The fact that he himself does not chant the liturgy has been attributed by Cardinal Timothy Dolan to his having only one lung.

Francis first descended to the tomb of St. Peter in St. Peter's Basilica where, along with the patriarchs and major-archbishops of the Eastern Catholic Churches, he prayed at the tomb. Then the pallium and the Ring of the Fisherman were carried up from the tomb by two deacons to be borne in procession. Then the pope and the Eastern Catholic patriarchs and major-archbishops returned to the main floor of the basilica and processed along with the other cardinals, bishops and other clergy to the square chanting the Laudes Regiae.

Cardinal Protodeacon Jean-Louis Tauran bestowed the pallium on the pope. The most senior elector from the cardinal-priests present, Godfried Daneels, read aloud the formal prayer for the new pope before the Ring of the Fisherman was presented. Angelo Sodano, Dean of the College of Cardinals, presented him with his Fisherman's Ring of gold-plated silver, unlike his predecessors', which were of gold. Six cardinals, two of each order, then professed their obedience to Pope Francis on behalf of the College of Cardinals. The six cardinals were: Giovanni Battista Re and Tarcisio Bertone representing the cardinal-bishops; Joachim Meisner and Jozef Tomko representing the cardinal-priests; and Renato Raffaele Martino and Francesco Marchisano representing the cardinal-deacons.

Liturgical book 
Ad hoc rituals were used for the inaugurations of the pontificates of Popes John Paul I and John Paul II. On 20 April 2005, Pope Benedict XVI approved a permanent rite, a draft of which had been made by the Office of Liturgical Celebrations of the Supreme Pontiff under John Paul II. This was published as an official liturgical book of the Church with the name Ordo Rituum pro Ministerii Petrini Initio Romae Episcopi (Order of the Rites for the Inauguration of the Petrine Ministry of the Bishop of Rome). Archbishop Piero Marini, the Papal Master of Ceremonies, described it as part of the application to papal rites of the liturgical reforms that followed the Second Vatican Council.

The Ordo contains not only the rite of the Mass of the Inauguration, but also that of the Mass of the Enthronement on the cathedra romana, the chair of the Bishop of Rome, in the Lateran Basilica, Rome's cathedral and the Catholic Church's primary basilica, outranking even the St. Peter's Basilica. Popes usually take possession of the Lateran Basilica within a few days of the inauguration of the pontificate.

Shortly before he resigned, Pope Benedict XVI introduced some modifications: strictly non-sacramental ceremonies take place not within Mass but either before Mass or without Mass; the individual act of homage by each cardinal is restored; a wider choice of music is provided; and the time for taking possession of the basilicas of Saint Paul Outside the Walls and Saint Mary Major is not limited to the two or three weeks following the inauguration.

List of papal inaugurations since 1978

See also
Papal coronation

Notes

References

External links
 Pope Benedict XVI explains the symbolism of the inauguration ceremony
 Video of the inauguration Mass of Pope Benedict XVI

Election of the Pope
Inauguration